The Feaellidae are a family of pseudoscorpions with the single genus Feaella.

Species
Feaella Ellingsen, 1906
 subgenus Feaella Ellingsen, 1906
 Feaella mirabilis Ellingsen, 1906 — western Africa
 Feaella mombasica Beier, 1955 — Kenya
 subgenus Difeaella Beier, 1966
 Feaella krugeri (Beier, 1966) — southern Africa
 subgenus Tetrafeaella Beier, 1955
 Feaella affinis Hirst, 1911 — Seychelles
 Feaella anderseni (Harvey, 1989) — Australia
 Feaella capensis Beier, 1955 — southern Africa
 Feaella capensis nana (Beier, 1966) — southern Africa
 Feaella indica J.C. Chamberlin, 1931
 Feaella leleupi (Beier, 1959) — Zaire
 Feaella mucronata Tullgren, 1907 — southern Africa
 Feaella parva Beier, 1947 — southern Africa
 Feaella perreti (Mahnert, 1982) — Kenya

References 

 Joel Hallan's Biology Catalog: Feaellidae

 
Pseudoscorpion families
Monogeneric arthropod families